Albertine Baclet (born 1 December 1922) is a politician from Guadeloupe who served in the French National Assembly from 1967 to 1968. She turned 100 on 1 December 2022.

References 

1922 births
Living people
People from Grand-Bourg
Guadeloupean politicians
Union of Democrats for the Republic politicians
Deputies of the 3rd National Assembly of the French Fifth Republic
Women members of the National Assembly (France)
20th-century French women politicians
French centenarians
Women centenarians